Paton is an Italian motorcycle manufacturer. In 1957 after FB Mondial pulled out of Grand Prix racing, Paton was set up by Giuseppe Pattoni (chief mechanic of the FB Mondial GP team) and designer Lino Tonti.

See also 

Paton PG500RC
List of Italian companies
List of motorcycle manufacturers

References

External links

Motorcycle manufacturers of Italy
Italian brands
Vehicle manufacturing companies established in 1958
Italian companies established in 1958